Oleg Anatolyevich Nilov (b. May 8, 1962, Kaliningrad Oblast) is a Russian politician and member of the State Duma of the Russian Federation (since 2016), deputy head of the fraction of the A Just Russia party.

Biography 
In 1985, he graduated from the Saint Petersburg State University of Aerospace Instrumentation.
He worked at a plant and was a Komsomol member.

In 1999, he graduated from the Russian Presidential Academy of National Economy and Public Administration and in 2004 from the Saint Petersburg State University.

In 2014 he received a Russian Federation Presidential Certificate of Honour.

On 24 March 2022, the United States Treasury sanctioned him in response to the 2022 Russian invasion of Ukraine.

References

1962 births
Living people
A Just Russia politicians
Russian Presidential Academy of National Economy and Public Administration alumni
Saint Petersburg State University alumni
Sixth convocation members of the State Duma (Russian Federation)
Seventh convocation members of the State Duma (Russian Federation)
Eighth convocation members of the State Duma (Russian Federation)
Russian individuals subject to the U.S. Department of the Treasury sanctions
Members of Legislative Assembly of Saint Petersburg